Luis "Lucho" Revilla (born 1972 in La Paz, Bolivia) is a Bolivian politician who has been the mayor of La Paz since 31 May 2010, succeeding Juan del Granado.  Before becoming mayor, he worked over ten years for the city.  He is married to Maricruz Ribera.

References

Living people
1972 births
Mayors of La Paz